The Hong Kong national under-17 football team is a national association football youth team of Hong Kong and is controlled by the Hong Kong Football Association.

Competition records

FIFA U-17 World Cup record

AFC U-16 Championship record

AFC U-17 Asian Cup record

Coaching Staff

Most recent squad
The following 23 players have been named for the 2023 AFC U-17 Asian Cup qualification.
 Head coach:  Takuro Hosaka

|-----
! colspan="9" bgcolor="#B0D3FB" align="left" |

|-----
! colspan="9" bgcolor="#B0D3FB" align="left" |

|-----
! colspan="9" bgcolor="#B0D3FB" align="left" |

Recent results and fixtures

2019

2022

See also
Hong Kong national football team
Hong Kong national under-23 football team
Hong Kong national under-20 football team
Hong Kong Football Association
Football in Hong Kong
Sport in Hong Kong
Hong Kong

References

External links
 The Hong Kong Football Association

Under-17
Asian national under-17 association football teams